Inter Gaz București was a Romanian professional football club from Bucharest, Romania, founded in 1973 and dissolved in 2009.

History
The club was founded in the summer of 1973 as Mecos București once with the canning and luncheon meats factory with the same name from Popești-Leordeni, a village from Ilfov County near to Bucharest. 

Coached by Florea Sisilică, Mecos was promoted to third division at the end of the 1988–89 season by winning the Bucharest Municipal Championship and the promotion  playoffs contested against the winners of the Ilfov County Championship, AS Chiajna (0–0 and 3–0) and the Călărași County Championship, Înainte Modelu (3–0 and 1–3).

In the first three seasons in Divizia C, Mecos enjoyed success finishing in the top-table: 6th in 1989–90 season, 3rd in 1990–91 season and 4th in 1991- 92 season.

The club name changed in 1992 to AS Glina and two years later, after was finished 14th in the 1992–93 season and 18th at the end of the 1993–94 season, it was relegated, ending a five-season stay in the third division.

In the summer of 1994 AS Glina merged with Gaz Metan București and was renamed as Intergaz-Glin.

In the 1996–97 season, coached by Nicolae Dumitru, Inter Gaz won the series from which was part in the Bucharest Municipal Championship and played the play-off with the winner of the other Bucharest series, Antilopa București, promoting to Divizia C after 4–1 at the Rocar Stadium.

Stadium
Inter Gaz played its home matches at Inter Gaz Stadium, in Popești-Leordeni, which has a capacity of 100 seats.

Honours
Liga III
Winners (1): 2000–01
Runners-up (1): 2006–07

Liga IV – Bucharest
Winners (2): 1988–89, 1996–97

Notable former players
The footballers mentioned below have played at least 1 season for Inter Gaz and also played in Liga I for another team.

  Constantin Bârsan
  Sergiu Bar
  Cristian Vasc
  Sorin Bucuroaia
  Gabriel Mărgărit
  Marius Coporan
  Cristian Vlad
  Alin Savu
  Eduard Nicola
  Augustin Chiriță
  Ionuț Voicu
  Daniel Novac
  Ionuț Curcă
  Eusebiu Tudor
  Bobi Verdeș

Managers 
 Cornel Nica (2000–2002)
 Victor Roșca (2002–2004)
 Marius Lăcătuș (2005)
 Marius Șumudică (2007)
 Ștefan Nanu (2008)

References

Sport in Bucharest
Association football clubs established in 1973
Association football clubs disestablished in 2009
Defunct football clubs in Romania
Liga II clubs
Liga III clubs
1973 establishments in Romania
2009 disestablishments in Romania